Clyde Watson (born Guyana) is a retired Guyanese footballer who played professionally in the American Soccer League. He is currently assistant coach at the Washington Freedom.

Watson attended Clemson University, where he played on the men's soccer team from 1973 to 1976.  He was All ACC each of his four seasons with the Tigers.  In 2002, he was named to the ACC 50th Anniversary Team.

In 1979, he was a First Team All Star with the New York Eagles of the American Soccer League.  In 1980 and 1981, he played for the Pennsylvania Stoners of the American Soccer League. Watson represented Guyana in 1982 World Cup qualifying, scoring four goals in the first round series versus Grenada. In 1982, he moved to the Detroit Express where he played the 1982 and 1983 seasons.

After retiring from playing, Watson went into the coaching ranks.  Over the years as a girl's youth coach, his teams have won at least eleven Virginia State Cups, two Region 1 championships and the 2007 National Championship.  In 2001, he was hired as an assistant coach with the Washington Freedom of the Women's United Soccer Association.  In 1995, he served as an assistant with the Washington Warthogs of the Continental Indoor Soccer League.

References

External links
 Washington Freedom coaching profile
 MISL/ASL stats

1956 births
Guyanese football managers
Guyanese footballers
Guyanese expatriate footballers
Guyana international footballers
Expatriate soccer players in the United States
Guyanese expatriate sportspeople in the United States
American Soccer League (1933–1983) players
Charlotte Gold players
Clemson Tigers men's soccer players
Continental Indoor Soccer League coaches
Detroit Express (1981–1983) players
Major Indoor Soccer League (1978–1992) players
New York Eagles players
Pennsylvania Stoners players
Philadelphia Fever (MISL) players
Washington Freedom non-playing staff
Living people
UDC Firebirds men's soccer coaches
United Soccer League (1984–85) players
Wichita Wings (MISL) players
Women's association football managers
Association football forwards
Afro-Guyanese people
Sportspeople from Georgetown, Guyana
Association football midfielders